Lynn Mahoney (born 1964) is an American university president, author, and social historian. Mahoney is the president of San Francisco State University (SFSU) since July 2019, and is the first woman to hold this role. Her scholarly work has focused on United States history, women's history, feminism, race studies, and ethnicity. She is the author of Elizabeth Stoddard and the Boundaries of Bourgeois Culture (2004, Routledge); a book about novelist and poet Elizabeth Stoddard.

Biography  
Lynn Mahoney was born on May 19, 1964 in the United States. She attended Stanford University, graduating with a Bachelor of Arts degree (1986) in American studies; followed by studies at Rutgers University, graduating with a Doctor of Philosophy (1999) in history. She is married to history professor Charles Ponce de Leon, together they have two children.

Prior to her role at SFSU, she previously worked at State University of New York at Purchase; California State University, Long Beach (August 2008–2015); and California State University, Los Angeles (February 2015–2019) as the Provost and Vice President of Academic Affairs.

San Francisco State University 
In July 2019, Mahoney succeeded Leslie Wong, to serve as the 14th President of San Francisco State University and the first woman President. During her tenure was the COVID-19 pandemic, which forced a move towards online classes, budget shortfalls, and staff cuts. 

In September 2020, SFSU faculty Rabab Abdulhadi and Tomomi Kinukawa were hosting a virtual class lecture on Zoom (software) by Leila Khaled, a Palestinian political activist with a militant history, when the Zoom canceled the broadcast due to the company's support of a pro-Zionism stance. The Leila Khaled event brought SFSU into a tense national news debate on the "boundaries and consequences of freedom of expression", and had Mahoney fielding questions about her support and/or lack of support for the Middle Eastern studies program.

Publications

References

External links 
 Biography and profile at San Francisco State University

1964 births
Living people
Stanford University alumni
Rutgers University alumni
American academic administrators
Social historians
Women's historians
California State University, Los Angeles faculty
California State University, Long Beach faculty
State University of New York at Purchase faculty
Presidents of San Francisco State University
21st-century American women